Stefano Badami (December 10, 1888 – March 31, 1955) was the first boss of the Elizabeth crime family. Badami controlled the family from Elizabeth, New Jersey. In 1937, after Gaspare D'Amico went into hiding, his family gained rackets in Newark, New Jersey. Badami was murdered in 1955 in a power struggle between rival factions of his crime family.

References

1888 births
1955 deaths
DeCavalcante crime family
Murdered American gangsters of Italian descent